= Saint Vincent and the Grenadines Chess Championship =

The Saint Vincent and the Grenadines Chess Championship is the annual individual chess championship of Saint Vincent and the Grenadines. The inaugural Tyrone Jack Memorial Open National Chess Championships was held on 17 December 2021. Chinedu Benjamin Enemchukwu finished first in a tournament field of six players to become the first national champion.

== Results ==
Year	Winners Open Category		
2021	Chinedu Benjamin Enemchukwu - 1st	Glendon Swift - 2nd	Michael Stephens - 3rd

== Results ==
Year	Winners Open Category		
2022	Raymond Osakwe - 1st	Chinedu Enemchukwu - 2nd	Uchechukwu Kennedy Ojiogu - 3rd

Year	Winners Women Category		
2022	Arianna Balcombe - 1st	Ronnia Durham-Balcombe - 2nd	Janiya Bruce - 3rd

Year	Winners Youth Category		
2022	Vedant Shetty - 1st	Arianna Balcombe - 2nd	Carlos Veira - 3rd

== Results ==
Year	Winners Open Category		
2023	Uchechukwu Kennedy Ojiogu - 1st	Chinedu Enemchukwu - 2nd	James Schneider U - 3rd

Year	Winners Women Category		
2023	Molissa Ashton- 1st	Arianna Balcombe - 2nd	3rd

Year	Winners Youth Category		
2023	Vedant Shetty - 1st	Dantés La Primavera - 2nd	Carlos Veira - 3rd

== Results ==
Year	Winners Open Category		
2024	Raymond Osakwe - 1st	Vedant Shetty - 2nd	Chinedu Enemchukwu - 3rd

Year	Winners Women Category		
2024	Rebecca Izuchukwu- 1st	Brinicia May - 2nd	Ronnia Durham-Balcombe - 3rd

Year	Winners Youth Open Category	
2024	Vedant Shetty - 1st	Le’ mar Abbott - 2nd

Year	Winners Youth female Category	
2024	Arianna Balcombe - 1st	Daria Bolgova - 2nd

== Results ==
Year	Winners Open Category		
2025	Vedant Shetty - 1st	Raymond Osakwe - 2nd	Terrence Latchman - 3rd

Year	Winners Women Category		
2025	Ronnia Durham-Balcombe- 1st	Molissa Ashton - 2nd	Kazene Pierre - 3rd

Year	Winners Youth Open Category		
2025	Nathanael Lawrence - 1st	Le’mar Abbot - 2nd	Lucas Huggins - 3rd

Year	Winners Youth female Category	
2025	Stacy Baptiste-King - 1st	Arianna Balcombe - 2nd
